Razdor is a rural locality (a selo) in Khutorsky Selsoviet of Volodarsky District, Astrakhan Oblast, Russia. The population was 199 as of 2010. There are 4 streets.

Geography 
It is located on the Bely Ilmen River, 22 km west of Volodarsky (the district's administrative centre) by road. Bely Ilmen is the nearest rural locality.

References 

Rural localities in Volodarsky District, Astrakhan Oblast